The women's 50m freestyle S5 event at the 2008 Summer Paralympics took place at the Beijing National Aquatics Center on 15 September. There were two heats; the swimmers with the eight fastest times advanced to the final.

Results

Heats
Competed from 10:04.

Heat 1

Heat 2

Final
Competed at 19:04.

Swimming at the 2008 Summer Paralympics
2008 in women's swimming